Yola is a genus of beetles in the family Dytiscidae, containing the following species:

 Yola alluaudi Peschet, 1925
 Yola babaulti Peschet, 1921
 Yola bertrandi Guignot, 1952
 Yola bicarinata (Latreille, 1804)
 Yola bicostata Zimmermann, 1926
 Yola bicristata (Sharp, 1882)
 Yola bistroemi Rocchi, 2000
 Yola buettikeri Brancucci, 1985
 Yola consanguinea (Régimbart, 1892)
 Yola costipennis (Fairmaire, 1869)
 Yola counselli Biström, 1991
 Yola cuspis Bilardo & Pederzani, 1978
 Yola darfurensis J.Balfour-Browne, 1947
 Yola deviata Biström, 1987
 Yola dilatata Régimbart, 1906
 Yola dohrni (Sharp, 1882)
 Yola endroedyi Biström, 1983
 Yola enigmatica Omer-Cooper, 1954
 Yola ferruginea Biström, 1987
 Yola fluviatica Guignot, 1952
 Yola frontalis Régimbart, 1906
 Yola gabonica Biström, 1983
 Yola grandicollis Peschet, 1921
 Yola indica Biström, 1983
 Yola intermedia Biström, 1983
 Yola kivuana Guignot, 1958
 Yola marginata Biström, 1983
 Yola mocquerysi (Régimbart, 1894)
 Yola natalensis (Régimbart, 1894)
 Yola nigrosignata Régimbart, 1895
 Yola nilgiricus Biström, 1983
 Yola ocris Guignot, 1953
 Yola panelii Biström, 1982
 Yola peringueyi Guignot, 1942
 Yola pinheyi Biström, 1983
 Yola porcata (Klug, 1834)
 Yola senegalensis Régimbart, 1895
 Yola simulantis Omer-Cooper, 1965
 Yola subcostata Bilardo & Rocchi, 1999
 Yola subopaca Régimbart, 1895
 Yola swierstrai Gschwendtner, 1935
 Yola tschoffeni Régimbart, 1895
 Yola tuberculata Régimbart, 1895
 Yola wraniki Wewalka, 2004

References

Dytiscidae genera